Patursson is a surname. Notable people with the surname include:

Erlendur Patursson (1913–1986), Faroese politician and writer
Helena Patursson (1864–1916), Faroese actress, writer and political feminist
Jóannes Patursson (1866–1946), Faroese nationalist leader and poet
Rói Patursson (born 1947), Faroese writer and philosopher
Tróndur Patursson (born 1944), Faroese painter, sculptor, and glass artist

See also
Patterson